The 2021–22 season was the Persepolis's 21st season in the Pro League, and their 39th consecutive season in the top division of Iranian Football. They also competed in the Hazfi Cup, Super Cup and AFC Champions League.

Squad

New Contracts

Transfers

In

Out

Technical staff 

|}

Pre-season and friendlies

Competitions

Overview

Persian Gulf Pro League

Results summary

Results by round

League table

Matches

Hazfi Cup

Super Cup

AFC Champions League

2021

knockout stage

2022

The AFC announced that Esteghlal and Persepolis had not satisfied the mandatory criteria of the AFC Club Licensing Regulations, and their licences were withdrawn by the AFC's independent Entry Control Body, and thus were declared ineligible to participate in the 2022 AFC Champions League.

Statistics

Goal scorers

Assists

Goalkeeping

Man of the Match

Disciplinary record
Includes all competitive matches. Players with 1 card or more are included only.

Club

Kit 

|- style="vertical-align: top;"
|

Sponsorship

References

External links 
Iran Premier League Statistics
Persian League
Persepolis News

2021-22
Iranian football clubs 2021–22 season